NIC ASIA Bank was founded as Nepal Industrial and Commercial Bank on 21 July 1998. It was renamed NIC ASIA Bank on 30 June 2013 after it merged with Bank of Asia. The merger was the first between of two commercial banks in the Nepalese Banking history. After the merger, NIC ASIA was recognized as ”Bank of the Year 2013-Nepal” by The Banker, Financial Times, UK. This is the second time that the bank was recognized with this prestigious award, the previous occasion being in 2007. The Bank has successfully completed its 21 years of operation. The company has currently the following wholly owned subsidiaries: NIC Asia Capital Limited and NIC Asia Laghubittiya Sanstha limited.

The bank, with its 359 branches, 473 ATMs, 102 extension counters and 81 branchless banking service is the largest bank in terms of footprint expansion, customer base including balance sheet size. Currently bank is providing services to more than 3 million customers(2022,April). 

The bank is headed by Tulsi Ram Agrawal as its chairman and Roshan Kumar Neupane as chief executive officer. Neupane was appointed as CEO of the bank on 2 December 2018 with four years tenure.

Ownership structure
The bank currently has a paid-up capital of Nepalese Rupees 11.56 Billion  (as of FY 2019–20)

See also
 List of banks in Nepal
 Nepal Stock Exchange

References

Banks of Nepal
1998 establishments in Nepal